Folks-Sztyme, or People's Voice in English, was a bilingual magazine published in Polish and Yiddish in Communist Poland between 1946 and 1991.

An homonymous newspaper existed before World War II. According to Henri Minczeles, the paper began to be circulated in 1946, from Łódź, but it moved to Warsaw after a few years. In 1953, the American Jewish Yearbook noted that "The only newspaper was the Communist Folks-Sztyme. It appeared four days a week and had an illustrated weekly supplement. Yiddishe Szriften, a monthly devoted to literature and art, continued to appear under the sponsorship of the Social and Cultural Union."

From 1956 onwards, it was published by the official Jewish association formed by the Communist authorities, the Social and Cultural Association of Jews in Poland.

The editor from 1950 to 1968 was Hersz (Gregory) Smolar, and after 1968 successively Samuel Tenenblatt and Adam Kwaterko.

Due to the declining number of Jews in Poland, the number of his readers constantly decreased and it became a weekly in 1968. In 1991, it ceased operations and a year later it was replaced by the monthly The Jewish Word (Polish: Słowo Żydowskie, Dos Jidisze Wort).

References

1946 establishments in Poland
1991 disestablishments in Poland
Communism in Poland
Communist magazines
Defunct magazines published in Poland
Defunct political magazines
Magazines established in 1946
Magazines disestablished in 1991
Mass media in Łódź
Magazines published in Warsaw
Polish-language magazines
Yiddish-language mass media in Poland
Yiddish periodicals
Political magazines published in Poland
Weekly magazines published in Poland
Jews and Judaism in Warsaw